Fagbug is a Volkswagen New Beetle owned by Erin Davies of Syracuse, New York, who, in response to graffiti on her car, embarked on a trans-American road trip to raise awareness of LGBT rights.

History
On April 18, 2007, Davies, an art education graduate student at Sage College of Albany, found the words "fag" and "U R gay"  spray-painted on her car. In response, she dropped out of college and started on a  trip through 41 U.S. states, during which she interviewed 536 people and spoke out against hate crimes. Davies received a sponsorship from Volkswagen Group of America and HD Radio to use for gas money, car expenses, and the film.

See also

Homophobia
LGBT pride

References

External links
 Fagbug.com
 
 Erin Davies Radio Interview, National Public Radio
 Erin Davies Video Interview, Syracuse.com
 Dear Vandal, The Huffington Post
 The Fagbug Reaches All 50 States, The Huffington Post
 Fagbug Filmmaker Is Driven To Fight Intolerance And So Is Her Car, Lexington Herald-Leader
 Fagbug Car Sparks Controversy At High School, Journal Gazette
 Fagbug Vandalized Again, Vanity Fair

2007 in LGBT history
American documentary films
LGBT history in the United States
Documentary films about LGBT topics
LGBT rights movement
Volkswagen Beetle